S1, S01, S.I, S-1, S.1, Š-1 or S 1 may refer to:

Biology and chemistry
 S1 nuclease, an enzyme that digests singled-stranded DNA and RNA
 S1: Keep locked up, a safety phrase in chemistry
 Primary somatosensory cortex, also known as S1
 Tegafur/gimeracil/oteracil, also known as S-1, a chemotherapy medication

Entertainment
 S1 (Indian TV channel), a Hindi-language channel
 S1 (Swiss TV channel), a German-language channel
 S1 (producer), a hip hop producer, member of the group Strange Fruit Project
 S1 No. 1 Style, a Japanese adult video company
 Gibson S-1, a guitar made by the Gibson Guitar Corporation
 A member of the S1W (group) that later became part of the music group Public Enemy.

Government
 Bill S-1, a pro forma bill in Canadian Parliament
 Form S-1, a U.S. Securities and Exchange Commission filing
 S-1 Executive Committee, a United States government entity during World War II 
 S1 (military), an administrative position within military units

Technology
 ACPI S1 power state, in computing; see 
 Apple S1, integrated computer used in the Apple Watch
 Canon PowerShot S1 IS, a 2004 3.2 megapixel digital camera
 FinePix S1 Pro, a 2000 interchangeable lens digital single-lens reflex camera by Fujifilm
 Nikon Coolpix S1, a digital camera
 S1 Corporation, an American software development company
 S1 Core, a microprocessor-core
 S1 MP3 Player
 Samsung Galaxy S (2010 smartphone)
 Sendo S1, a Sendo mobile phone model
 Siemens S1, a Siemens mobile phone
 Sony BDP-S1, a first generation Blu-ray Disc (BD) Player
 S1, an EPC in an LTE/4G network

Transportation

Routes

China
 Line S1 (Beijing Subway)
 Line S1 (Nanjing Metro)
 Line S1 (Wenzhou Rail Transit)
 S1 Yingbin Expressway in Shanghai

Germany
 S1 (Berlin), an S-Bahn line
 S1 (Dresden), an S-Bahn line
 S1 (Munich), an S-Bahn line
 S1 (Nuremberg), an S-Bahn line
 S1 (Rhine-Main S-Bahn), an S-Bahn line
 S1 (Rhine-Ruhr S-Bahn), an S-Bahn line
 S1 (Stuttgart), an S-Bahn line
 a planned Bremen S-Bahn line
 a Hamburg S-Bahn line
 a Hanover S-Bahn line
 a RheinNeckar S-Bahn line
 a Rostock S-Bahn line
 a Stadtbahn Karlsruhe line

Switzerland
 S1 (Bern S-Bahn), an S-Bahn line in the canton of Bern
 S1 (RER Vaud), an S-Bahn line in the canton of Vaud
 S1 (St. Gallen S-Bahn), an S-Bahn line in the canton of St. Gallen
 S1 (ZVV), now subsumed by S24, a Zürich S-Bahn line

United States
 County Route S1 (California)
 S1 (Long Island bus)

Other countries
 S1 (Vienna), an S-Bahn line in Austria
 Line S1 (Milan suburban railway service), Italy
 S-1 Strategic Highway, Pakistan
 Expressway S1 (Poland)
 FGC line S1, a suburban train line in Barcelona Province, Spain
 Stagecoach Gold bus route S1, in Oxfordshire, England, UK

Vehicles

Aircraft
 Blackburn Buccaneer S.1 jet naval strike aircraft
 Focke-Wulf S 1, a German Focke-Wulf aircraft
 Fokker S.I, a 1919 Dutch primary trainer aircraft
 Hopfner S-1, a Hopfner aircraft
 Letov S-1, a 1920 Czechoslovak surveillance aircraft
 Loening S-1, a United States Army Air Service seaplane
 Loughead S-1 Sport 1920 US biplane
 Martinsyde S.1, a 1914 British biplane aircraft
 Pantsir-S1, a Russian anti-aircraft system
 Pitts S-1 aerobatic biplane
 S-1 Loening, a United States Army Air Service seaplane
 SSBS S1, a French experimental rocket
 Swift S-1, a 1991 Polish single seat aerobatic glider

Cars
 Audi S1, performance variant of Audi A1
 Invicta S1, a 2004 sports car
 S1 Scout Car, an armoured car built in Australia during the Second World War
 Superformance S1 Roadster, a Lotus Seven Type replicar produced in South Africa 2001–2004

Other vehicles
 Alco S-1, a locomotive
 PRR S1, a duplex locomotive developed by the Pennsylvania Railroad
 LNER Class S1, a class of British steam locomotives 
 NER Class S1, a class of British steam locomotives 
 USS S-1 (SS-105), a 1918 United States Navy experimental submarine

Other uses
 S1 (classification), a disability swimming classification
 S postcode area covering Sheffield City Centre
 in human anatomy:
 the first sacral vertebra
 the sacral spinal nerve 1 of the vertebral column
 the primary somatosensory cortex in the brain
 Senior 1, the First Year in the Scottish secondary education system
 Season (television) or series one
 Comet Ikeya-Seki, C/1965 S1
 Upplands regemente (signal), a 1902 Signal Regiment of the Swedish Armed Forces

With superscripts and subscripts
S1 may refer to :
 S1 (heart sound), a heart sound in cardiac auscultation
S1 may refer to :
 S1, the n-sphere in two dimensions i.e. a circle
 Inverse second (s−1), a unit of frequency

S01
S01 may refer to :
 Akai S01, an Akai synthesizer
 ATC code S01 Ophthalmologicals, a subgroup of the Anatomical Therapeutic Chemical Classification System
 HMS Porpoise (S01), a 1956 Porpoise-class submarine of the Royal Navy
 MULTI-S01, an encryption algorithm based on a pseudorandom number generator